AWI or Awi may refer to:

Awi
the Awi people, an ethnic group in Ethiopia
Awi, Iran, a village in Zanjan Province, Iran

AWI
 IATA airport code for Wainwright Airport (Alaska)
 ICAO airline code for Air Wisconsin
 Alfred Wegener Institute for Polar and Marine Research, Germany's major organization for Arctic, Antarctic and deep sea research
 Animal Welfare Institute
 Arab World Institute
 Australian Watercolour Institute
 American War of Independence
 Axial Ward-Takahashi identity, used to calculate quark masses in lattice gauge theory
 Approved Work Item is a status in the development of an ISO standard